The Jameh Mosque of Saveh ( – Masjed-e-Jāmeh Sāveh) is a Seljuk-era mosque, located in Saveh, Iran. This monument was built in the 12th century, coinciding with the establishment of the city itself.

History
Like so many monuments of central Iran, the Jameh Mosque of Saveh's core is of the 12th century, and its single surviving minaret is dated in 1110 and 1061. The proportions of its façade are also related to systems of proportion established in the 12th century, although the work itself is, apparently, of the early 16th. Recent discoveries indicate that the mosque might have been constructed on the foundations of an older mosque dating back to the 10th. Several inscriptions found in the mosque date back to the 10th century.

Architecture and design
The Jameh Mosque of Saveh comprises a courtyard, porch, a minaret, a few nocturnal areas, dome and two archaic altars with inscription in Kufic script. Two altars dating to the Safavid-era are adorned with inscriptions in Thuluth script. There are also other inscriptions, inscribed with sacred verses, in Kufic and Thuluth scripts. There is an elevated porch between two nocturnal areas in the western front, and at its either sides there exists several chambers.

The mosque has a rectangular open court which is 36x44 meters and is surrounded by columns made of brick. In the west side of the open court, there is a large iwan; the iwan's height and width are nearly the same. The dome of this mosque is 14 meters in diameter and 16 meters high. Internally the dome has been adorned with tiles.

The mosque, originally, had two minarets but only one minaret remains standing; the minaret is 14 meters in height and 3.5 meters in diameter. The superb, varied bands of raised brick patterns and inscriptions in Kufic and Naskhi scripts make this minaret the finest of the Seljuk period still standing. The minaret was originally 30 meters high; the upper section is missing and the lowest section of the remaining shaft has been restored with plain brick bond.

The minaret was recorded as on Iran's National Heritage list on 6 January 1932.

Gallery

See also
 List of mosques in Iran

References 

Mosques in Iran
12th-century mosques
10th-century mosques
Seljuk architecture
Mosque buildings with domes
National works of Iran
Saveh
Architecture in Iran
Buildings and structures in Markazi Province